Portugal competed at the 1992 Summer Paralympics in Barcelona, Spain. 30 competitors from Portugal won 9 medals including 3 gold, 3 silver and 3 bronze and finished joint 29th in the medal table with Cuba.

See also 
 Portugal at the Paralympics
 Portugal at the 1992 Summer Olympics

References 

Nations at the 1992 Summer Paralympics
1992
Summer Paralympics